The Mandarin Oriental Chengdu is a supertall skyscraper on hold in Chengdu, the capital of Sichuan province in southwest China. Construction started in 2013.

The tower is a mixed-use development located on a riverfront site in the Jin-jiang district. The tower was designed by Aedas.

The Mandarin Oriental Chengdu will have a rooftop bar and tea lounge, a Chinese restaurant serving Sichuan cuisine, three speciality dining venues and a Cake Shop. The hotel will also have a 1,200-seat ballroom and a 500-seat junior ballroom, as well as a variety of multi-purpose function spaces, which will be used to host conferences of all sizes.

See also
List of tallest buildings in China

References

Buildings and structures under construction in China
Aedas buildings
Hotels in Sichuan
Skyscrapers in Chengdu
Chengdu
Skyscraper hotels in China
Residential skyscrapers in China